Cyril Suk and Daniel Vacek were the defending champions but they competed with different partners that year, Suk with Hendrik Jan Davids and Vacek with Richey Reneberg.

Davids and Suk lost in the first round to Mark Keil and Peter Nyborg, as did Reneberg and Vacek to Emilio Sánchez and Christo van Rensburg.

Byron Black and Grant Connell won in the final 6–2, 6–3 against Libor Pimek and Byron Talbot.

Seeds

Draw

Final

Top half

Bottom half

Qualifying

Seeds

Qualifiers

Qualifying draw

First qualifier

Second qualifier

References
 Official results archive (ATP)
 Official results archive (ITF)

Men's Doubles
Doubles